Mike Horner (born Donald Thomas Hart February 3, 1955) is an American pornographic film actor. He is sometimes credited as Don Hart (a play on "Darn Hard"), Don Horner, "Dan Sir" or Johnny Wilson.

Horner began acting in small sex films, at the time referred to as loops (named after the style of their presentation, constantly looped 16 mm films shown in booths), in January 1978. His first feature movie was 1979's Tangerine. He has been in over 1500 feature (story-based) films and videos, and he has performed in over 500 additional all sex videos, with approximately 1800 actresses. A frequent and popular costar in the 1980s was legend Hyapatia Lee.

Biography 
Horner attended San Francisco State University and UCLA, and graduated from Sonoma State University. He pursued acting, theater and dance prior to his porn career, but he became more involved after his exposure to adult films. Horner started out making only around $40–100 a movie. While only a sideline job at first, hardcore finally became his primary income in 1983. He made the move to Southern California in 1991 to make porn his primary objective. He started directing movies in 1993, but he found mixed success, as porn had made the move to gonzo type movies, different from his artistic tastes. He has directed Tangled (1993, Pleasure Prod.), Dreams of Desires (owned by him but not legally available), Taoist Sexuality (1999, Adam & Eve), and 13 other feature videos. He is a member of the AVN and XRCO Halls of Fame.

He has won Best Actor/Best Supporting Actor and non-sex acting awards from the AVN eight times, as well as several European awards. His AVN Best Actor award-winning films include, Sexually Altered States (1987), Justine: Nothing to Hide (1993, Vivid), Seduction of Mary (1995, VCA Pictures), Lessons in Love (1996, HeatWave) and Euphoria (2000, Wicked). He continues to act and produce adult films periodically.

In 2009, he co-starred in the spoof Celebrity Pornhab with Dr. Screw.

References

External links 

 
  as a performer
  as a director
 

1955 births
American male pornographic film actors
Living people
Sonoma State University alumni
Male actors from Portland, Oregon
Pornographic film actors from Oregon